The English singer and songwriter Gary Barlow has recorded songs for three solo studio albums, a joint album and has also collaborated with other artists on their respective singles. In 1996, Take That, a boy band consisted of five members, including Barlow, disbanded after 6 years recording music together. Three months after the release of their then-final single, the singer launched his solo debut song, "Forever Love"; it was written solely by Barlow and featured more mature sound than the work previously released by Take That. The single has been succeeded by Barlow's 1997 debut studio album, Open Road, a primary pop and blue-eyed soul oriented record. It was mainly written and composed by Barlow himself, however, he listed some songwriters in the penning process. American entertainer Madonna and producer Shep Pettibone wrote "Love Won't Wait" for the album, although it was originally planned for a Madonna project which she later abandoned. Barlow worked with American songwriter Dianne Warren with whom he co-wrote the song "My Commitment" for the album. Howard Perdew and Andy Spooner wrote "So Help Me Girl", a single for which Barlow recorded a Spanish-language version titled "Ayúdame" (English: Help Me).

In 1998 the singer released Open Road in America with a slightly altered track listing. For that version of the record, he collaborated with Swedish producers Max Martin and Kristian Lundin and co-wrote the track, "Superhero".

Songs

See also 

List of songs written by Gary Barlow
Gary Barlow discography
Take That discography

References

External links 

Gary Barlow  Biography, Albums & Streaming Radio on AllMusic

 
Barlow, Gary